Ogeum-dong is neighbourhood of Gunpo, Gyeonggi Province, South Korea.

In Choseon era, Ogeum-dong was called 'Goegok-ri(傀谷里)', and because there was  Elm-like Tree, it also called 'Neutiul'.

External links
 Geumjeong-dong 

Neighbourhoods in Gunpo